Ku Kam Fai (born 27 January 1961) is a Hong Kong former professional footballer and the current head coach of South China. His nickname is Muk Tsui Fai (木嘴輝).

He is widely regarded as one of the best defenders and sweepers in Hong Kong football history. He served for 13 years in the South China Athletic Association, which lasted for most of his career.

5.19 World Cup qualification victory
Ku Kam Fai was one of the members in the famous "5.19" match, when Hong Kong historically beat China by 2–1 in the 1986 FIFA World Cup Qualifying Round on 19 May 1985. Moreover, he is the one who scored the winning goal for Hong Kong in the match.

Today
On 23 February 2007, he was invited to represent SCAA 92/93 Invitation Team to play against SCAA Elite Youth in the pre-match of the exhibition competition BMA Cup organised by South China.

References

External links
 Scaaft.com

Asian Games competitors for Hong Kong
Association football sweepers
Footballers at the 1990 Asian Games
Hong Kong First Division League players
Hong Kong football managers
Hong Kong footballers
Hong Kong international footballers
Living people
South China AA managers
South China AA players
1961 births